Eliseu Lemos Padilha (23 December 1945 – 13 March 2023) was a Brazilian lawyer and politician, who was appointed by then-President Dilma Rousseff as the minister of the Brazilian Civil Aeronautics Government Department. He was in office from 1 January 2015 to 1 December 2015. He also served as minister of Transport and Infrastructure between 1997 and 2001 (appointed by then-President Fernando Henrique Cardoso) and for four terms as federal congressman of the state of Rio Grande do Sul, his birthplace.

Padilha was one of the few ministers to have resigned from a ministerial office because of a divergent position from their government's policies.

Padilha died on 13 March 2023, at age 77.

References

|-

|-

|-

|-

1945 births
2023 deaths
20th-century Brazilian lawyers
Brazilian Democratic Movement politicians
Chiefs of Staff of Brazil
Government ministers of Brazil
Members of the Chamber of Deputies (Brazil) from Rio Grande do Sul